La Joya is a city in Baja California also known as "La Gloria"  in the Tijuana Municipality. The city had a population of 30,063 as of 2018. Its urban area links Tijuana with Rosarito Beach.

See also

La Jolla, San Diego

References

External links

Populated places in Tijuana Municipality